Major Ernst Grahame Joy  (2 November 1888 – 21 June 1993) was an American-born Canadian who became a flying ace during the First World War, credited with eight aerial victories. He had set aside his law studies and family obligations to join the Canadian Expeditionary Force, then transferred to the Royal Flying Corps. While he left military service after World War I to practice law, he would return to the colours for World War II.

Early life
Ernst Grahame Joy was born in Anniston, Alabama, USA on 2 November 1888. He was the son of Jean Hannah Grahame and Harold Holt Joy.

He was a third year law student in Osgoode Hall Law School's Class of 1916 in Toronto when he enlisted into the 74th Battalion of the Canadian Expeditionary Force on 1 July 1915. On his enlistment forms, he claimed to be married. Because of five years previous experience in the Canadian military, he was accepted at the rank of major. His oath of allegiance to King George V denoted him as a naturalized Canadian citizen, as an American could not swear such an oath without losing his citizenship. However, genealogical records give his marriage date as 15 July 1915. He married Dorothy Ewart Primrose of Toronto in Humphries Township. His military unit at time of marriage was recorded as 60th Battalion, CEF.

World War I
Joy was seconded to the Royal Flying Corps from the Central Ontario Regiment, CEF, and appointed a flying officer on 23 April 1917. On 9 May 1917, he was posted to No. 49 Squadron, but soon moved on to No. 23 Squadron. In June or July 1917, he was assigned to No. 57 Squadron as a bomber pilot. He scored seven victories for them in July and August 1917, before going to No. 205 Squadron. On 1 September 1917, he was appointed a flight commander. He scored once more, on 4 November 1918, a week before the armistice.

List of aerial victories

Post World War I
On 31 May 1919, Joy's secondment to the RAF ended, and he also relinquished his commission. He was awarded the Distinguished Flying Cross in 1919, though no details of the award are available. There also is no record of his discharge date from the military; however, he returned to Canada and practiced law.

Joy served with the Royal Canadian Air Force during World War II.

He died in Toronto, Ontario on 21 June 1993.

References
Notes

Bibliography
 
 The Canada Law Journal, Volume 52. Law Society of Upper Canada, Canadian Bar Association; editors: James Patton, W. D. Ardagh, Robert Alexander Harrison, Henry O'Brien, Charles Bagot Labatt, Charles Morse. Canada Law Book Company, Limited, 1916.

1888 births
1993 deaths
People from Anniston, Alabama
Canadian flying aces
Canadian Expeditionary Force officers
Royal Flying Corps officers
Royal Air Force personnel of World War I
Recipients of the Distinguished Flying Cross (United Kingdom)
Canadian military personnel of World War II
American emigrants to Canada